Saverio Guerra (born August 25, 1964 in Brooklyn, New York) is an American actor, best known for his roles as Bob in the sitcom Becker and Mocha Joe in Curb Your Enthusiasm, along with numerous other roles in films and television series.

Career 
Guerra played Sammy Feathers in the crime drama EZ Streets, which originally aired on CBS from 1996 to 1997. He then joined the short-lived sitcom Temporarily Yours, playing Caesar Santos.

He played a recurring role, Willy the Snitch, on Buffy the Vampire Slayer from 1997-2000.

He played the obnoxious, sleazy Bob on the sitcom Becker, starring Ted Danson, from 1998 to 2003. Guerra was a recurring cast member during the first two seasons and a main cast member from season three through season five. Prior to the series' fourth season, the supporting cast members, including Guerra, filed a lawsuit against Paramount Television for breach of contract, after they did not receive a promised pay rise. The suit was ultimately settled and the series continued for six seasons. Guerra did not renew his contract for the shortened season 6. Bob's absence is explained by his going on vacation and he is never mentioned again.

He played Commissioner Brooks in Monk in the episode "Mr. Monk Gets Fired".

Guerra played Mocha Joe in season 7 of the HBO series Curb Your Enthusiasm, and reprised the role in season 10 as the season's "primary antagonist".

He appeared in an episode of the Netflix comedy She's Gotta Have It as well as the TBS comedy The Detour.

He played Neil DeLuca in the HBO series Show Me a Hero.

Guerra also played Sidney Franklin, a matador and friend of Ernest Hemingway, in the 2012 television biopic Hemingway & Gellhorn, directed by Philip Kaufman.

Other television roles include guest spots on shows like Caroline in the City and recurring parts on Weeds, and most recently Hightown and The Last O.G.

In addition to his television work, Guerra has appeared in several films including Mr. Wonderful (1993), Bad Boys (1995), Sleepers (1996), Blue Streak (1999), Summer of Sam (1999), and Lucky You.

Personal life 
He wrote a one-man show called Adoption about his family. He is the godfather of actress Shawnee Smith's son Jackson. He spent many years on the New York theater scene. Guerra grew up in a loving and loud family. It wasn't until he was faced with a life-threatening car accident that he decided to pursue his dream of becoming an actor.

Filmography

Film

Television

References

External links 
 

Living people
20th-century American male actors
21st-century American male actors
American male television actors
American people of Italian descent
1964 births